The Australia women's national soccer team results for the period 2010 to 2019.

Match results

2010

2011

2012

2013

2014

2015

2016

2017

2018

2019

See also
 Australia women's national soccer team results (1975–99)
 Australia women's national soccer team results (2000–09)
 Australia women's national soccer team results (2020–29)

External links
 Australian Results

References

2010-19
2009–10 in Australian women's soccer
2010–11 in Australian women's soccer
2011–12 in Australian women's soccer
2012–13 in Australian women's soccer
2013–14 in Australian women's soccer
2014–15 in Australian women's soccer
2015–16 in Australian women's soccer
2016–17 in Australian women's soccer
2017–18 in Australian women's soccer
2018–19 in Australian women's soccer
2019–20 in Australian women's soccer